Arianis a fiery-colored plant growing wild in Ariana, as appeared in Pliny's (Natural History) 24, 17, 102, § 162.

References 

Flora of Afghanistan